These are the list of results that England have played from 2010 to 2019.

2010 
Scores and results list England's points tally first.

45.45% winning rate for 2010.

2011 
Scores and results list England's points tally first.

76.92% winning rate for 2011.

2012 
Scores and results list England's points tally first.

50% winning rate for 2012.

2013 
Scores and results list England's points tally first.

80% winning rate for 2013.

2014
Scores and results list England's points tally first.

50% winning rate for 2014.

2015
Scores and results list England's points tally first.

66.67% winning rate for 2015.

2016
Scores and results list England's points tally first.

100% winning rate for 2016.

2017
Scores and results list England's points tally first.

Barbarians F.C. is classed as a non-capped match

90.90% winning rate for 2017.

2018
Scores and results list England's points tally first.

Barbarians F.C. is classed as a non-cap match

46.15% winning rate for 2018.

2019
Scores and results list England's points tally first.

Barbarians F.C. is classed as a non-cap match
England vs France was cancelled and declared a 0-0 draw, in the Rugby World Cup only, as a result of Typhoon Hagibis. No official caps were awarded or result recorded outside of the World Cup.

71% winning rate for 2019.

Year Box

References 

2010-19
2009–10 in English rugby union
2010–11 in English rugby union
2011–12 in English rugby union
2012–13 in English rugby union
2013–14 in English rugby union
2014–15 in English rugby union
2015–16 in English rugby union
2016–17 in English rugby union
2017–18 in English rugby union
2018–19 in English rugby union